The chapters of the Japanese manga The Flowers of Evil are written and illustrated by Shūzō Oshimi. The story follows a middle school student named Takao Kasuga who is forced into a "contract" by fellow student Sawa Nakamura, after being caught stealing the gym clothes of his crush Nanako Saeki, and the series of events afterwards that follow these three characters. The manga was launched in the first issue of the Japanese manga magazine Bessatsu Shōnen Magazine published by Kodansha on September 9, 2009 and ended on May 9, 2014. Kodansha has compiled the 57 chapters into 11 volumes from March 17, 2010 to June 9, 2014. The series was licensed in North America by Vertical in September 2011, with the first volume published on May 8, 2012 and the last volume on October 14, 2014.

Chapter list

References 

Flowers of Evil, The